Falcón is a 2012 crime television series based on the books by Robert Wilson, produced by Mammoth Screen for the Sky, Canal+ and ZDF channels. It starred Marton Csokas as Chief Inspector Javier Falcón.

Cast and characters
Marton Csokas as Chief Inspector Javier Falcón
Hayley Atwell as Consuelo Jiménez
Charlie Creed-Miles as Inspector Luis Ramírez
Santiago Cabrera as Judge Esteban Calderón
Emilia Fox as Inés Conde De Tejada, estranged wife of Javier
Kerry Fox as Manuela Falcón, sister of Javier
James Floyd as Rafa Falcón, nephew of Javier
Natalia Tena as Christina Ferrera

Production
The series was filmed in Seville, Spain.
The stunt co-ordinator for the series was Ricardo Cruz Ardura.

Episode list

Reception
James Walton of The Telegraph was positive, remarking, 'this is a show that, depending on your mood, you could either find ridiculous or enjoy for its campy mix of classy direction and shameless self-importance. Personally I’d recommend doing both.'

References

External links
 

2010s British crime television series
2010s British drama television series
2012 British television series debuts
2012 British television series endings
British detective television series
2010s British television miniseries
Sky Atlantic original programming
Television series by Mammoth Screen
English-language television shows
Television shows set in Spain